The Sievers Sandberg Reserve Center is a U.S. Army Reserve training installation in New Jersey. It occupies .

It was previously Camp Pedricktown an Air Defense Base Construction under the Philadelphia District of the Army Corps of Engineers transferred to the New York District on July 1, 1960. The station had a Missile Master installation with an Army Air Defense Command Post, and associated search, height finder, and identification friend or foe radars. The obsolete Martin AN/FSG-1 Antiaircraft Defense System,a  1957-vintage vacuum tube computer, was removed after command of the defense area was transferred to the command post at Highlands Air Force Station near New York City. The Highlands AFS command post controlled the combined New York-Philadelphia Defense Area.

The air defense station, with an intact bunker was designated an historic site in 1998 by the Salem Historic Preservation Office.

References

External links
The 2000 environmental report for the station is the Recordation of the Nike Missile Master Complex Pedrickstown U.S. Army Reserve Support Facility.

Installations of the United States Army
1960 establishments in New Jersey
Military installations in New Jersey
Nuclear command and control